The Cat is a passenger / vehicle ferry operated by Bay Ferries Limited between Yarmouth and Maine.The vessel is a high speed catamaran built by the Tasmanian shipbuilder Incat.

History
The Cat was constructed for Bay Ferries as The Cat and operated seasonally in from 2002–2005 in international service from May to October across the Gulf of Maine between Yarmouth, Nova Scotia and Bar Harbor, Maine.  The vessel replaced the Incat 046 which had inaugurated high speed ferry services in North America on this route in 1997, using the marketing name "The Cat".

Starting in the winter of 2003–2004, Bay Ferries began to operate the vessel as a wet-lease charter during the off-season for the Gulf of Maine service, when the INCAT 046 had previously been laid up.  From November 2003 to April 2004, The Cat was operated by Bay Ferries for Bahama Florida Express, which was an inaugural high speed ferry service between Port Everglades, Florida and the Bahamas.  From December 2004 to April 2005, Bay Ferries operated The Cat between Port of Spain and Scarborough in Trinidad and Tobago for the Government of Trinidad and Tobago.  This same route was served by The Cat from November 2005 to May 2006 and INCAT 046 filled in from May to October.

After the 2005 demise of the Yarmouth-Bar Harbor route's competitor, Scotia Prince Cruises, using the M/V Scotia Prince between Yarmouth-Portland, Maine, Bay Ferries secured this additional route for The Cat beginning in May 2006.  For that season, The Cat operated from Yarmouth to Bar Harbor on Mondays to Thursdays and from Yarmouth to the Ocean Gateway International Marine Passenger Terminal in Portland on Fridays to Sundays.

On December 18, 2009 Bay Ferries announced that it was ending its Gulf of Maine service from Yarmouth to Bar Harbor and Portland after the Government of Nova Scotia ended the subsidies, resulting in approximately 120 jobs being lost.  Bay Ferries had been seeking approximately $6.0 million for the 2010 operating season but the provincial government declined, citing financial difficulty.

In 2011 The Cat was purchased by Fujian Cross Strait Ferry. The vessel has been renamed Hai Xia Hao (海峽號) which means "Straits" and operated between Taichung and Pingtan Island.

, The Cat is owned and operated by Bay Ferries Limited, servicing Yarmouth, Nova Scotia to Bar Harbor, Maine, USA.

Vessel characteristics

The CAT is a  vessel built by InCat Australia in Hobart, Tasmania in 2002 as The Cat.

The CAT is constructed from marine grade aluminium alloys. Each water-borne hull is subdivided into multiple watertight compartments connected by an arched bridging structure with a central forward hull above the smooth water line.  Each water-borne hull carries two engines which drive water jets mounted on the transom.

Vehicles are stowed in and between both waterborne hulls in a configuration of rising and descending decks which load from a single level transfer bridge at the stern.  The main passenger deck is immediately above the vehicle decks and consists of a cafe, gift shop, children's play area and passenger seating lounges, as well as an outside observation deck that runs the width of the ship at the stern.  The passenger seating lounges have overhead television monitors which play movies or television broadcasts, as well as a continuously updated map showing the vessel's GPS coordinates.

Sisterships
The Cat is one of six 98-metre catamarans built by Incat. The other vessels are Normandie Express, T&T Spirit, Milenium Dos, HSV 2 Swift and Milenium Tres.

References

External links
 Bay Ferries - The Cat official website

Ships built by Incat
Ferries of Taiwan
Incat high-speed craft
2002 ships